Kenna is a recording artist.

Kenna may also refer to:
several hurricanes; see Hurricane Kenna (disambiguation)
The Irish/Scottish feminine form of the given name Kenneth

Places
Kenna, West Virginia, small community in the United States
Kenna, New Mexico, small unincorporated village in the United States

Characters
The Groovy Girls doll line, by Manhattan Toy, features a doll named Kenna.
Lady Kenna in Reign (TV series)

People with the surname Kenna
Colin Kenna (born in 1976), Irish boxer
Conor Kenna (born in 1984), Irish footballer
Doug Kenna (born in 1924), player of American football
Edward Kenna (1919-2009), Australian soldier, awarded Victoria Cross
Ed Kenna, college football coach in the 1900s
J. N. Kenna (1888–1950), Justice of the Supreme Court of Appeals of West Virginia
Jack Kenna (born in 1932), player of Gaelic football
Jamie Kenna, British actor
Jeff Kenna (born in 1970), Irish footballer
John E. Kenna (1848–1893), West Virginia politician
Kathleen Kenna, Canadian journalist
Michael Kenna (politician) (1857–1946), Chicago politician ("Hiny Dink" Kenna)
Michael Kenna (photographer) (born in 1953), British photographer
Paul Aloysius Kenna (1862–1915), English Brigadier General and recipient of Victoria Cross
Peter Kenna (1930–1987), Australian playwright and radio actor